Jack Spencer was an English professional rugby league footballer who played in the 1900s. He played at representative level for Great Britain and England, and at club level for Salford, as a forward (prior to the specialist positions of), during the era of contested scrums.

Spencer won a cap for England while at Salford in 1908 against Wales, and won a cap for Great Britain while at Salford in 1908 against New Zealand.

References

England national rugby league team players
English rugby league players
Great Britain national rugby league team players
Place of birth missing
Place of death missing
Rugby league forwards
Salford Red Devils players
Year of birth missing
Year of death missing